Matthew J. Tow is an Australian singer-songwriter and multi-instrumentalist. Perhaps best known as the singer and guitarist of 1990s Sydney indie band Drop City, Tow currently fronts international neo-psychedelic rockers the Lovetones.

Rolling Stone hailed Tow's songwriting as being worthy of Ray Davies, Bowie, Lennon and McCartney.

Splash 
Tow's first experience as a recording artist came with early 1990s Sydney indie band Splash (which also included singer-songwriter Gavin Mclean), who released a four-track EP titled Pendulum in 1991.  The Tow–Mclean songwriting partnership would spill over onto early Drop City releases.

Drop City 
Tow formed Drop City (also known as Drop City Three) in Sydney, Australia, at the beginning of 1993.   Later that year they recorded their first album A Revolution Of Purely Private Expectations which was released on the Red Eye label through Polydor in 1994. Two more albums were to follow; Yesterday, Today and Tomorrow and, Chiaroscuro. After four albums, a handful of EPs, two Big Day Out appearances and tour support for artists such as the Stone Roses, Stereolab, Yo La Tengo and Manic Street Preachers, Drop City disbanded in late 2000 amid what Tow described as a 'tidal wave of indifference'.

Drop City Discography:

Colorsound 
In 1994, Tow recorded a solo album You’re Only As Good As Your Sound under the moniker of Colorsound which was picked up by Summershine Records in Australia. The following year it was released in the US on Sub Pop. He has since released a further four albums in this guise.  These releases are typically instrumental and experimental.

Colorsound Discography:

Brian Jonestown Massacre 
In 2003, Tow had the opportunity to join long-time friend Anton Newcombe and his San Francisco–based psychedelic outfit, The Brian Jonestown Massacre, touring the US and the UK with them for three months as a guitarist.  He also contributed two songs to their 2003 album ...And This is Our Music.  Tow's opening track "Starcleaner" later also appeared on the BJM retrospective Tepid Peppermint Wonderland.

The Lovetones 
The Lovetones released their debut album, Be What You Want, in 2002 through Bomp! Records.  The album was reviewed in Creem and Rolling Stone magazine. The second album, Meditations, was released through New York's Tee Pee Records in late 2005. Returning from shows in the US in late 2005 and also at SXSW 2006, The Lovetones toured to support Meditations Australian release in May 2006. In June 2006 The Lovetones completed a European tour across 12 countries with The Brian Jonestown Massacre in support of Meditations, released there through Tee Pee/Cargo Records, culminating in an album review in respected UK magazine Uncut.  The Lovetones performed a reunion show in Sydney on 31 July 2015.

The Lovetones also recorded their third album, Axiom, during 2006 with sessions split between Figment Studios in Hollywood and the Sydney Opera House Recording Studio. The new album was released in June 2007 through Tee Pee Records.The Lovetones Discography:'''

 Personal life 
Tow is married and lives in Sydney, Australia.

His first solo album, The Way of Things, was released in February 2013 and the follow up, Shadows' Reign'', was released in 2016 by Xemu Records.

References

External links 
– The Lovetones interview/live performance at rhino.com (Nov 2005)
– Colorsound (Matthew J Tow solo project)

Year of birth missing (living people)
Living people
Australian male singers
Australian rock singers
Australian rock guitarists
Australian songwriters
Australian autoharp players
Psychedelic rock musicians
Australian male guitarists